Juho Sylvester Perälä (24 August 1887 in Teuva – 20 January 1938 in Medvezhyegorsk; also known as Sylvester Perälä; name as Soviet citizen Иван Иванович Перяля) was a Finnish farmer and politician. Originally a member of the Social Democratic Party of Finland (SDP), he later joined the Socialist Workers' Party of Finland (SSTP), which was banned in 1923. In 1925 Perälä joined the still illegal Communist Party of Finland (SKP). He was a member of the Parliament of Finland from 1928 to 1930, representing the pro-communist but legal Socialist Electoral Organisation of Workers and Smallholders (STPV), which was banned in 1930. 

In July 1930, Perälä was abducted by activists of the anti-communist Lapua Movement, which forced him to cross the border to the Soviet Union. In 1931 Perälä became a Soviet citizen. He joined the Communist Party of the Soviet Union and was active as a party functionary in the Karelian ASSR. On 14 November 1935 he was expelled from the Communist Party. As one of the victims of the Great Purge, he was arrested by the NKVD on 10 December 1937, sentenced to death and shot in Medvezhyegorsk on 20 January 1938. He was posthumously rehabilitated by Soviet authorities in 1956.

References

1887 births
1938 deaths
People from Teuva
People from Vaasa Province (Grand Duchy of Finland)
Social Democratic Party of Finland politicians
Socialist Workers Party of Finland politicians
Socialist Electoral Organisation of Workers and Smallholders politicians
Communist Party of Finland politicians
Communist Party of the Soviet Union members
Members of the Parliament of Finland (1927–29)
Members of the Parliament of Finland (1929–30)
Finnish emigrants to the Soviet Union
People granted political asylum in the Soviet Union
Great Purge victims from Finland
Finnish people executed by the Soviet Union
Soviet rehabilitations
Members of the Communist Party of the Soviet Union executed by the Soviet Union